The Voice Indonesia (season 1) is an Indonesian reality talent show that premiered on 10 February on Indosiar. Based on the reality singing competition The Voice of Holland, the series was created by Dutch television producer John de Mol. It is part of an international series. The show was cancelled after the season ended due to poor ratings, but was revived in 2016 after RCTI acquired the rights through meetings with show creator John de Mol.

Team
Color Key

The First Phase: The Blind Auditions 
Colour key

Episode 1: February 10, 2013

Episode 2: February 17, 2013

Episode 3: February 24, 2013

Episode 4: March 3, 2013

Episode 5: March 10, 2013

Episode 6: March 17, 2013

The Second Phase: The Battle Rounds 

The battle rounds were filmed in Studio 5 Indosiar on February 24, 2013. The first two-hour episode was broadcast on March 24, 2013. After the Blind Auditions, each coach had 14 (Armand Maulana and Sherina Munaf) or 15 (Glenn Fredly and Giring Ganesha) contestants for the Battle Rounds, which aired from March 24 to April 21. Coaches began narrowing down the playing field by training the contestants with the help of "trusted advisors". Each episode featured battles consisting of pairings from within each team, and each battle concluded with the respective coach eliminating one or two of the two or three contestants. Each coach has also picked an assistant. Armand Maulana has picked Once Mekel, Sherina Munaf has chosen Vina Panduwinata, Glenn Fredly is assisted by Ello, and Giring Ganesha by Titi DJ.

Color key:

Sing-off 

After the Battle Round, each coach ranks their own contestants based on Battle Round performances. The contestants who get 6th and 7th placed will head to head in sing-off rounds, singing their Blind Audition song, back to back, and concluded with the respective coach eliminating one of the two contestants; the winners will join the other contestants and advance to live show.

Color key:

The Third Phase: The Live Shows

Live show details
Color keys

Episode 12: Live Rounds, week 1

Episode 13: Live Rounds, week 2
Guest Performance by Sandhy Sondoro ("Malam Biru")

Episode 14: Live Rounds, week 3

Episode 15: Live Rounds, week 4

 Note
 Due of health issue, Sherina Munaf was absent during the episode. Vina Panduwinata replaced her as a commenter but the decision was made by Sherina.

Episode 16: Live Rounds, Semi Final

Episode 17: Live Rounds, Final
The live performance show and result show aired on Sunday, June 2, 2013. 
Guest Performance by Noah ("Jika Engkau")

Elimination Chart
Color Key

Result details

References

External links
 Official sites

2013 Indonesian television seasons
season 1